Sonavi River is a river in Ratnagiri district of Maharashtra. It originates near Prachitgad and merges into Shastri River near Sangameshwar.

References 

Rivers of Maharashtra
Ratnagiri district
Rivers of the Western Ghats